Roberto Vezzoli is an Italian sport shooter who won the 2015 IPSC Shotgun World Shoot Standard division title. At the IPSC European Handgun Championship he took bronze in the Modified division in 2010, and silver in the Classic division in 2013. He also has a total of five Italian championship titles. He is the Beretta Shooting Team Handgun captain from 2018 and he was involved in the development of Beretta 92X Performance.

See also 
 Josh Froelich, American sport shooter
 Kim Leppänen, Finnish sport shooter

References

External links 
 Video of Roberto Vezzoli at the IPSC 2015 Shotgun World Shoot (YouTube)

Year of birth missing (living people)
Living people
IPSC shooters
Italian male sport shooters
Place of birth missing (living people)
21st-century Italian people